The United States invasion of Grenada began at dawn on 25 October 1983. Codenamed Operation Urgent Fury by the U.S. military, it resulted in military occupation within a few days. It was triggered by the strife within the People's Revolutionary Government which resulted in the house arrest and execution of the previous leader and second Prime Minister of Grenada Maurice Bishop, and the establishment of the Revolutionary Military Council with Hudson Austin as Chairman. The invasion resulted in the appointment of an interim government, followed by elections in 1984.

Grenada had gained independence from the United Kingdom in 1974. The communist New Jewel Movement seized power in a coup in 1979 under Maurice Bishop, suspending the constitution and detaining several political prisoners. In September 1983, an internal power struggle began over Bishop's leadership performance. Bishop was pressured at a party meeting to share power with Deputy Prime Minister Bernard Coard. Bishop initially agreed, but later balked. He was put under house arrest by his own party's Central Committee until he relented. When his secret detention became widely known, Bishop was freed by an aroused crowd of his supporters. A confrontation then ensued at military headquarters between Grenadian soldiers loyal to Coard and civilians supporting Bishop. Shooting started under still-disputed circumstances. At least 19 soldiers and civilians were killed on 19 October 1983 including Bishop, his partner Jacqueline Creft, two other cabinet ministers and two union leaders.

The Reagan administration in the U.S. launched a military intervention following receipt of a formal appeal for help from the Organisation of Eastern Caribbean States. In addition, the Governor-General of Grenada Paul Scoon secretly signaled he would also support outside intervention, but he put off signing a letter of invitation until 26 October. Reagan also stated that he acted due to "concerns over the 600 U.S. medical students on the island" and fears of a repeat of the Iran hostage crisis.

The invasion began on the morning of 25 October 1983, just two days after the bombing of the U.S. Marine barracks in Beirut. The invading force consisted of the 1st and 2nd battalions of the US Army's 75th Ranger Regiment, the 82nd Airborne and the Army's rapid deployment force, U.S. Marines, Army Delta Force, Navy SEALs, and ancillary forces totaling 7,600 troops, together with Jamaican forces and troops of the Regional Security System (RSS). The force defeated Grenadian resistance after a low-altitude airborne assault by Rangers and the 82nd Airborne on Point Salines Airport at the south end of the island, and a Marine helicopter and amphibious landing on the north end at Pearls Airport. Austin's military government was deposed and replaced, with Scoon as Governor-General, by an interim advisory council until the 1984 elections.

The invasion was criticized by many countries. British Prime Minister Margaret Thatcher privately disapproved of the mission and the lack of notice that she received, but she publicly supported it. The United Nations General Assembly condemned it as "a flagrant violation of international law" on 2 November 1983 by a vote of 108 to 9.

The date of the invasion is now a national holiday in Grenada called Thanksgiving Day, commemorating the freeing of several political prisoners who were subsequently elected to office. A truth and reconciliation commission was launched in 2000 to re-examine some of the controversies of the era; in particular, the commission made an unsuccessful attempt to find Bishop's body, which had been disposed of at Austin's order and never found. The invasion also highlighted issues with communication and coordination between the different branches of the American military when operating together as a joint force, contributing to investigations and sweeping changes in the form of the Goldwater-Nichols Act and other reorganizations.

Background

Sir Eric Gairy had led Grenada to independence from the United Kingdom in 1974, but his term in office coincided with civil strife in Grenada. He was head of the Grenada United Labour Party and claimed victory in the general election of 1976, but the opposition did not accept the result as legitimate. The civil strife took the form of street violence between Gairy's private army the Mongoose Gang, and gangs organized by the New Jewel Movement (NJM). Maurice Bishop led the NJM in an armed revolution and overthrew the government on 13 March 1979, while Gairy was out of the country, establishing the People's Revolutionary Government.

Airport 
The Bishop government began constructing the Point Salines International Airport with the help of the United Kingdom, Cuba, Libya, Algeria, and other nations. The British government proposed the airport in 1954 when Grenada was still a British colony. Canadians designed it, the British government underwrote it, and a London firm built it. The American government accused Grenada of constructing facilities to aid a Soviet-Cuban military buildup in the Caribbean based on the  runway which could accommodate the largest Soviet aircraft, such as the An-12, An-22, and the An-124. Such a facility would enhance the Soviet and Cuban transportation of weapons to Central American insurgents and expand Soviet regional influence. Bishop's government claimed that the airport was built to accommodate commercial aircraft carrying tourists, pointing out that such jets could not land at Pearls Airport with its  runway on the island's north end, and that Pearls could not be expanded because its runway abutted a mountain at one end and the ocean at the other.

In 1983, Representative Ron Dellums (D, California) traveled to Grenada on a fact-finding mission, having been invited by the country's prime minister. He described his findings before Congress:

Based on my personal observations, discussion, and analysis of the new international airport under construction in Grenada, it is my conclusion that this project is specifically now and has always been for the purpose of economic development and is not for military use.... It is my thought that it is absurd, patronizing, and totally unwarranted for the United States government to charge that this airport poses a military threat to the United States' national security.

In March 1983, President Reagan began issuing warnings about the threat posed to the United States and the Caribbean by the Soviet-Cuban militarization of the Caribbean, evident from the excessively long airplane runway being built and intelligence indicating increased Soviet interest in the island. He said that the runway and the numerous fuel storage tanks were unnecessary for commercial flights, and that evidence indicated that the airport was to become a Cuban-Soviet forward military airbase.

October 1983 
On 16 October 1983, Deputy Prime Minister Bernard Coard seized power and placed Bishop under house arrest. Mass protests against the coup led to Bishop escaping detention and reasserting his authority as the head of the government. He was eventually captured and murdered by a firing squad of soldiers, along with his partner and several government officials and union leaders loyal to him. The army under Hudson Austin then stepped in and formed a military council to rule the country, placing Governor-General Paul Scoon under house arrest. The army announced a four-day total curfew during which anyone seen on the streets would be summarily executed.

The Organization of Eastern Caribbean States (OECS), Barbados, and Jamaica all appealed to the United States for assistance. Scoon had requested the invasion through secret diplomatic channels, but it was not made public for his safety. He was well within his rights to take this action under the reserve powers vested in the Crown. On Saturday, 22 October 1983, the Deputy High Commissioner in Bridgetown, Barbados visited Grenada and reported that Scoon was well and "did not request military intervention, either directly or indirectly", but in his 2003 autobiography, Survival for Service, Scoon maintains he asked the visiting British diplomat to pass along "an oral request" for outside military intervention at this meeting.

On 25 October, the combined forces of the United States and the Regional Security System (RSS) based in Barbados invaded Grenada in an operation code named Operation Urgent Fury. The United States stated that this was done at the request of Barbados' Prime Minister Tom Adams and Dominica's Prime Minister Eugenia Charles. The invasion was highly criticized by the governments in Canada, Trinidad and Tobago, and the United Kingdom. The United Nations General Assembly condemned it as "a flagrant violation of international law" by a vote of 108 to 9, with 27 abstentions.

First day of the invasion

H-hour for the invasion was set for 05:00 on 25 October 1983. U.S. troops deployed for Grenada by helicopter from Grantley Adams International Airport on Barbados before daybreak. Nearly simultaneously, American paratroopers arrived directly by transport aircraft from bases in the eastern United States and U.S. Marines were airlifted to the island from the USS Guam offshore. It was the first major operation conducted by the American military since the Vietnam War. Vice Admiral Joseph Metcalf III, Commander of the Second Fleet, was the overall commander of American forces, designated Joint Task Force 120, which included elements of each military service and multiple special operations units. Fighting continued for several days and the total number of American troops reached some 7,000 along with 300 troops from the Organization of American States, commanded by Brigadier Rudyard Lewis of Barbados.

The main objectives on the first day were for the 75th Ranger Regiment to capture the Point Salines International Airport in order for the 82nd Airborne Division to land reinforcements on the island; the 2nd Battalion, 8th Marine Regiment to capture Pearls Airport; and other forces to rescue the American students at the True Blue Campus of St. George's University. In addition, a number of special operations missions were undertaken by Army Delta Force operatives and Navy SEALs to obtain intelligence and secure key individuals and equipment. Many of these missions were plagued by inadequate intelligence, planning, and accurate maps of any kind, and the American forces mostly relied upon tourist maps.

Defending forces

People's Revolutionary Army

The invading forces encountered about 1,500 Grenadian soldiers of the People's Revolutionary Army (PRA) manning defensive positions. The PRA troops were for the most part equipped with light weapons, mostly Kalashnikov-pattern automatic rifles of Soviet bloc origin, and smaller numbers of obsolete SKS carbines and PPSh-41 submachine guns. They had few heavy weapons and no modern air defense systems. The PRA was not regarded as a serious military threat by the US, which was more concerned by the possibility that Cuba would send a large expeditionary force to intervene on behalf of its erstwhile ally.

The PRA did possess eight BTR-60PB armored personnel carriers and two BRDM-2 armored cars delivered as military aid from the Soviet Union in February 1981, but no tanks.

Cuban forces in Grenada
The Cuban military presence in Grenada was more complex than initially thought. Most of the Cuban civilian expatriates present were also military reservists. Fidel Castro described the Cuban construction crews in Grenada as "workers and soldiers at the same time", claiming the dual nature of their role was consistent with Cuba's "citizen soldier" tradition. At the time of the invasion, there were an estimated 784 Cuban nationals on the island. About 630 of the Cuban nationals listed their occupations as construction workers, another 64 as military personnel, and 18 as dependents. The remainder were medical staff or teachers. Colonel Pedro Tortoló Comas was the highest-ranking Cuban military officer in Grenada in 1983, and he later stated that he issued small arms and ammunition to the construction workers for the purpose of self-defense during the invasion, which may have further blurred the line between their status as civilians and combatants. They were also expressly forbidden to surrender to US military forces if approached. The regular Cuban military personnel on the island were serving as advisers to the PRA at the time. Cuban advisers and instructors deployed with overseas military missions were not confined to non-combat and technical support roles; if the units to which they were attached participated in an engagement, they were expected to fight alongside their foreign counterparts.

Bob Woodward wrote in Veil that captured "military advisors" from socialist countries, including Cuba, were actually accredited diplomats and their dependents. He claimed that none of them took any actual part in the fighting. The US government asserted that most of the supposed Cuban civilian technicians on Grenada were in fact military personnel, including special forces and combat engineers. A summary of the Cuban presence in The Engineer, the official periodical of the US Army Engineer School, noted that "resistance from these well-armed military and paramilitary forces belied claims that they were simply construction crews."

Navy SEAL reconnaissance missions

U.S. Special Operations Forces were deployed to Grenada beginning on 23 October, before 25 October invasion. Navy SEALs from SEAL Team 6 and Air Force combat controllers were air-dropped at sea to perform a reconnaissance mission on Point Salines. The helicopter drop went wrong; four SEALs were lost at sea and their bodies never recovered, causing most people to suspect they had drowned. The four SEALs were Machinist Mate 1st Class Kenneth J. Butcher, Quartermaster 1st Class Kevin E. Lundberg, Hull Technician 1st Class Stephen L. Morris, and Senior Chief Engineman Robert R. Schamberger. In an interview conducted by Bill Salisbury and published on 4 October 1990, Kenneth Butcher's widow claimed that she had gone to Grenada hoping that her husband had survived. She said, "There was this fisherman who said he saw four guys in wetsuits come out of the water, and then two days later he saw four bodies being thrown into the water. So we would like to think they made it, 'cause there was a boat smashed up on the beach. We would like to think the four of them got in that boat, made it to shore, got someplace, and were captured. And they're, you know, gonna come back." The SEAL and Air Force survivors continued their mission, but their boats flooded while evading a patrol boat, causing the mission to be aborted. Another SEAL mission on 24 October was also unsuccessful, due to harsh weather, resulting in little intelligence being gathered in advance of the impending intervention.

Air assault on Point Salines 
Alpha and Bravo companies of the 1st Battalion of the 75th Ranger Regiment embarked on C-130s at Hunter Army Airfield at midnight on 24 October to perform an air assault landing on Point Salines International Airport, intending to land at the airport and then disembark. The Rangers had to switch abruptly to a parachute landing when they learned mid-flight that the runway was obstructed. The air drop began at 05:30 on 25 October in the face of moderate resistance from ZU-23 anti-aircraft guns and several BTR-60 armored personnel carriers (APCs), which were knocked out by M67 recoilless rifle fire. AC-130 gunships provided support for the landing. Cuban construction vehicles were commandeered to help clear the airfield, and one even used to provide mobile cover for the Rangers as they moved to seize the heights surrounding the airfield.

The Rangers cleared the airstrip of obstructions by 10:00 AM, and transport planes were able to land and unload additional reinforcements, including M151 Jeeps and members of the Caribbean Peace Force assigned to guard the perimeter and detainees. Starting at 14:00, units began landing at Point Salines from the 82nd Airborne Division under Edward Trobaugh, including battalions of the 325th Infantry Regiment. At 15:30, three BTR-60s of the Grenadian Army Motorized Company counter-attacked, but the Americans repelled them with recoilless rifles and an AC-130.

The Rangers fanned out and secured the surrounding area, negotiating the surrender of over 100 Cubans in an aviation hangar. However, a Jeep-mounted Ranger patrol became lost searching for True Blue Campus and was ambushed, with four killed. The Rangers eventually secured True Blue campus and its students, where they found only 140 students and were told that more were at another campus in Grand Anse. In all, the Rangers lost five men on the first day, but succeeded in securing Point Salines and the surrounding area.

Capture of Pearls Airport
A platoon of Navy SEALs from SEAL Team 4 under Lieutenant Mike Walsh approached the beach near Pearls Airport around midnight on 24 October after evading patrol boats and overcoming stormy weather. They found that the beach was lightly defended but unsuitable for an amphibious landing. The 2nd Battalion of the 8th Marine Regiment then landed south of Pearls Airport using CH-46 Sea Knight and CH-53 Sea Stallion helicopters at 05:30 on 25 October; they captured Pearls Airport, encountering only light resistance, including a DShK machine gun which a Marine AH-1 Cobra destroyed.

Raid on Radio Free Grenada
UH-60 Blackhawk helicopters delivered SEAL Team 6 operators in the early morning of 25 October to Radio Free Grenada with the purpose of using the radio station for psychological operations. They captured the station unopposed and destroyed the radio transmitter. However, they were attacked by Grenadian forces in cars and an armored personnel carrier (APC), which forced the lightly armed SEALs to cut open a fence and retreat into the ocean while receiving fire from the APC. The SEALs then reportedly swam to USS Caron. More credible reports say that rather than swimming to the Caron, a highly unlikely event, they destroyed the station and fought their way to the water, where they hid from patrolling enemy forces. They swam toward the open sea, and were picked up several hours later after being spotted by a reconnaissance plane.

Raids on Fort Rupert and Richmond Hill Prison
On 25 October, Delta Force and C Company of the 75th Ranger Regiment embarked in MH-60 and MH-6 Little Bird helicopters of Task Force 160 to capture Fort Rupert, where they believed the Revolutionary Council leaders lived, and Richmond Hill Prison, where political prisoners were being held. The raid on Richmond Hill Prison lacked vital intelligence, leaving the attackers unaware of the presence of several anti-aircraft guns and steep hilly terrain that left no room for helicopter landings. Anti-aircraft fire wounded passengers and crew and forced one MH-60 helicopter to crash land, causing another helicopter to land next to it to protect the survivors. One pilot was killed, and the Delta Force operators had to be relieved by a Navy Sea King helicopter. The raid on Fort Rupert, however, was successful in capturing several leaders of the People's Revolutionary Government.

Mission to rescue Governor-General Scoon

The last major special operation was a mission to rescue Governor-General Scoon from his mansion in Saint George, Grenada. The mission departed late at 05:30 on 25 October from Barbados, resulting in the Grenadian forces being already aware of the invasion and they guarded Scoon closely. The SEAL team entered the mansion without opposition, but BTR-60 armored personnel carriers counter-attacked and trapped the SEALs and governor inside. AC-130 gunships, A-7 Corsair strike planes, and AH-1 Cobra attack helicopters were called in to support the besieged SEALs, but they remained trapped for the next 24 hours.

At 19:00 on 25 October, 250 Marines from G Company of the 2nd Battalion, 8th Marine Regiment landed at Grand Mal Bay equipped with amphibious assault vehicles and four M60 Patton tanks; they relieved the Navy SEALs the following morning, allowing Governor Scoon, his wife, and nine aides to be safely evacuated at 10:00 that day. The Marine tank crews continued advancing in the face of sporadic resistance, knocking out a BRDM-2 armored car. G Company subsequently defeated and overwhelmed the Grenadian defenders at Fort Frederick.

Airstrikes 
Navy A-7 Corsairs and Marine AH-1 Cobra attack helicopters made airstrikes against Fort Rupert and Fort Frederick. An A-7 raid on Fort Frederick targeting anti-aircraft guns hit a nearby mental hospital, killing 18 civilians. Two Marine AH-1T Cobras and a UH-60 Blackhawk were shot down in a raid against Fort Frederick, resulting in five casualties.

Second day of the invasion

General Trobaugh of the 82nd Airborne Division had two goals on the second day: securing the perimeter around Salines Airport, and rescuing American students held in Grand Anse. The Army lacked undamaged helicopters after the losses on the first day and consequently had to delay the student rescue until they made contact with Marine forces.

Morning ambushes
Early on the morning of 26 October, Cuban forces ambushed a patrol from the 2nd Battalion of the 325th Infantry Regiment near the village of Calliste. The American patrol suffered six wounded and two killed, including the commander of Company B. Navy airstrikes and an artillery bombardment by 105mm howitzers targeting the main Cuban encampment eventually led to their surrender at 08:30. American forces pushed on to the village of Frequente, where they discovered a Cuban weapons cache reportedly sufficient to equip six battalions. Cuban forces ambushed a reconnaissance platoon mounted on gun-jeeps, but the jeeps returned fire, and a nearby infantry unit added mortar fire; the Cubans suffered four casualties with no American losses. Cuban resistance largely ended after these engagements.

Rescue at Grand Anse
On the afternoon of 26 October, Rangers of the 2nd Battalion of the 75th Ranger Regiment mounted Marine CH-46 Sea Knight helicopters to launch an air assault on the Grand Anse campus. The campus police offered light resistance before fleeing, wounding one Ranger, and one of the helicopters crashed on approach after its blade hit a palm tree. The Rangers evacuated the 233 American students by CH-53 Sea Stallion helicopters, but the students informed them that there was a third campus with Americans at Prickly Bay.

Third day of the invasion and after

By 27 October, organized resistance was rapidly diminishing, but the American forces did not yet realize this. The 2nd Battalion, 8th Marines continued advancing along the coast and capturing additional towns, meeting little resistance, although one patrol did encounter a single BTR-60 during the night, dispatching it with a M72 LAW. The 325th Infantry Regiment advanced toward the capital of Saint George, capturing Grand Anse and discovering 200 American students whom they had missed the first day. They continued to the town of Ruth Howard and Saint George, meeting only scattered resistance. An air-naval gunfire liaison team called in an A-7 airstrike and accidentally hit the command post of the 2nd Brigade, wounding 17 troops, one of whom died.

The Army had reports that PRA forces were amassing at the Calivigny Barracks, only five kilometers from the Point Salines airfield. They organized an air assault by the 2nd Battalion of the 75th Ranger Regiment preceded by a preparatory bombardment by field howitzers (which mostly missed, their shells falling into the ocean), A-7s, AC-130s, and USS Caron. However, the Blackhawk helicopters began dropping off troops near the barracks but they approached too fast. One of them crash landed and the two behind it collided with it, killing three and wounding four. The barracks were deserted.

In the following days, resistance ended entirely and the Army and Marines spread across the island, arresting PRA officials, seizing caches of weapons, and seeing to the repatriation of Cuban engineers. The 19 Grenadian soldiers defending the island surrendered without a fight. This was the last military action of the campaign.

Outcome

Official U.S. sources state that some of the opponents were well-prepared and well-positioned and put up stubborn resistance, to the extent that the Americans called in two battalions of reinforcements on the evening of 26 October. The total naval and air superiority of the American forces had overwhelmed the defenders. Nearly 8,000 soldiers, sailors, airmen, and Marines had participated in Operation Urgent Fury, along with 353 Caribbean allies from the Caribbean Peace Forces. American forces sustained 19 killed and 116 wounded; Cuban forces sustained 25 killed, 59 wounded, and 638 combatants captured. Grenadian forces suffered 45 dead and 358 wounded; at least 24 civilians were also killed, 18 of whom died in the accidental bombing of a Grenadian mental hospital. The US troops also destroyed a significant amount of Grenada's military hardware, including six BTR-60 APCs and a BRDM-2 armored car. A second BRDM-2 armored car was impounded and shipped back to Marine Corps Base Quantico for inspection.

Legality of the invasion
The US government defended its invasion of Grenada as an action to protect American citizens living on the island, including medical students. Deputy Secretary of State Kenneth W. Dam said that action was necessary to "resolve" what Article 28 of the charter of the Organization of American States (O.A.S.) refers to as "a situation that might endanger the peace". He added that the OAS charter and the UN charter both "recognize the competence of regional security bodies in ensuring regional peace and stability," referring to the decision by the Organisation of Eastern Caribbean States to approve the invasion.

The UN Charter prohibits the use of force by member states except in cases of self-defense or when specifically authorized by the UN Security Council. The UN Security Council had not authorized this invasion. Similarly, the United Nations General Assembly adopted General Assembly Resolution 38/7 by a vote of 108 to 9 with 27 abstentions, which "deeply deplores the armed intervention in Grenada, which constitutes a flagrant violation of international law." A similar resolution in the United Nations Security Council received widespread support but was vetoed by the United States.

Reaction in the United States

Time magazine described the invasion as having "broad popular support." A congressional study group concluded that the invasion had been justified, as most members felt that American students at the university near a contested runway could have been taken hostage as American diplomats in Iran had been four years previously. The group's report caused House Speaker Tip O'Neill to change his position on the issue from opposition to support.

However, some members of the study group dissented from its findings. Congressman Louis Stokes (D, Ohio) stated: "Not a single American child nor single American national was in any way placed in danger or placed in a hostage situation prior to the invasion." The Congressional Black Caucus denounced the invasion, and seven Democratic congressmen introduced an unsuccessful resolution to impeach President Reagan, led by Ted Weiss.

Medical students in Grenada speaking to Ted Koppel on 25 October 1983 edition of his newscast Nightline stated that they were safe and did not feel that their lives were in danger. Medical students told Koppel the next evening how grateful they were for the invasion and the Army Rangers, which probably saved their lives. State Department officials had assured the medical students that they would be able to complete their medical school education in the United States.

An anti-war march attended by over 50,000 people, including Burlington, Vermont Mayor Bernie Sanders, was held in Washington, D.C. The march received support from presidential candidate Jesse Jackson.

International reaction
The United Nations General Assembly adopted General Assembly Resolution 38/7 on 2 November 1983 by a vote of 108 to 9 which "deeply deplores the armed intervention in Grenada, which constitutes a flagrant violation of international law and of the independence, sovereignty and territorial integrity of that State." It went on to deplore "the death of innocent civilians" and the "killing of the Prime Minister and other prominent Grenadians", and it called for an "immediate cessation of the armed intervention" and demanded, "that free elections be organized".

This was the first overthrow of a Communist government by armed means since the end of World War II. The Soviet Union said that Grenada had been the object of United States threats, that the invasion violated international law, and that no small nation would find itself safe if the aggression were not rebuffed. The governments of some countries stated that the United States intervention was a return to the era of barbarism. The governments of other countries said the United States had violated several treaties and conventions to which it was a party. A similar resolution was discussed in the United Nations Security Council but it was ultimately vetoed by the United States.

President Ronald Reagan was asked if he was concerned by the lopsided 108–9 vote in the UN General Assembly. He said, "it didn't upset my breakfast at all."

Grenada is part of the Commonwealth of Nations and the intervention was opposed by Commonwealth members including the United Kingdom, Trinidad and Tobago, and Canada. British Prime Minister Margaret Thatcher, a close ally of Reagan on other matters, personally opposed it. Reagan told her that it might happen; she did not know for sure that it was coming until three hours before. At 12:30 on the morning of the invasion, Thatcher sent a message to Reagan:

Reagan told Thatcher before anyone else that the invasion would begin in a few hours, but ignored her complaints. She publicly supported the action. Reagan phoned to apologize for the miscommunication, and the long-term friendly relationship endured.

Aftermath and legacy

The American and Caribbean governments quickly reaffirmed Scoon as Queen Elizabeth's sole legitimate representative in Grenada, and hence was thus the only lawful authority on the island. In accordance with Commonwealth constitutional practice, Scoon assumed power as interim head of government and formed an advisory council which named Nicholas Brathwaite as chairman pending new elections. The New National Party won the elections in December 1984 and formed a government led by Prime Minister Herbert Blaize.

American forces remained in Grenada after combat operations finished in December as part of Operation Island Breeze. Elements remaining performed security missions and assisted members of the Caribbean Peacekeeping Force and the Royal Grenadian Police Force, including military police, special forces, and a specialized intelligence detachment. The Point Salines International Airport was renamed in honor of Prime Minister Maurice Bishop on 29 May 2009, his 65th birthday. Hundreds of Grenadians turned out to commemorate the honoring of the event. Prime Minister Tillman Thomas gave the keynote speech and referred to the renaming as an act of the Grenadian people coming home to themselves. He also hoped that it would help bring closure to a chapter of denial in Grenada's history.

United States
The invasion showed problems with the American "information apparatus," which Time magazine described as still being in "some disarray" three weeks after the invasion. For example, the State Department falsely claimed that a mass grave had been discovered which held 100 bodies of islanders who had been killed by communist forces. Major General Norman Schwarzkopf, deputy commander of the invasion force, said that 160 Grenadian soldiers and 71 Cubans had been killed during the invasion; the Pentagon had given a count of 59 Cuban and Grenadian deaths. Ronald H. Cole's report for the Joint Chiefs of Staff showed an even lower count.

Also of concern were the problems that the invasion showed with the military. There was a lack of intelligence about Grenada which exacerbated the difficulties faced by the quickly assembled invasion force. For example, they did not know that the students were actually at two different campuses, and there was a 30-hour delay in reaching students at the second campus. Maps provided to soldiers on the ground were tourist maps on which military grid reference lines were drawn by hand to report locations of units and request artillery and aircraft fire support. They also did not show topography and were not marked with crucial positions. Navy ships providing naval gunfire and Marine, Air Force, and Navy fighter-bomber support aircraft providing close air support mistakenly killed American ground forces due to differences in charts and location coordinates, data, and methods of calling for fire support. Communications between services were also not compatible and hindered the coordination of operations. The landing strip was drawn by hand on the map given to some members of the invasion force.

Reagan attempted to use the invasion of Grenada to end Vietnam Syndrome, a term used in reference to the American public's aversion to overseas conflicts that resulted from the Vietnam War. After the invasion, on 13 December 1983, Reagan asserted that "our days of weakness are over. Our military forces are back on their feet and standing tall."

Goldwater–Nichols Act

The Department of Defense recognized a need for improved communications and coordination among the branches of the American military. Congress investigated many of the problems and passed the Goldwater-Nichols Act of 1986 (Pub. L.99–433). This act reworked the command structure of the military, making the most sweeping changes to the Department of Defense since the department was established in the National Security Act of 1947. It increased the power of the Chairman of the Joint Chiefs of Staff and advanced the concept of unified joint forces organized under one command.

Other

25 October is a national holiday in Grenada, called Thanksgiving Day, to commemorate the invasion. St. George's University (SGU) built a monument on its True Blue campus to honor the American servicemen killed during the invasion, and marks the day with an annual memorial ceremony.

On 29 May 2009, the Grenadian government changed the name of Point Salines International Airport to Maurice Bishop International Airport.

Order of battle

Vice Admiral Joseph Metcalf, III, COMSECONDFLT, became Commander of Joint Task Force 120 (CJTF 120) and commanded units from the Air Force, Army, Navy, Marine Corps, and Coast Guard from the MARG flagship USS Guam. Rear Admiral Richard C. Berry (COMCRUDESGRU Eight) (Commander Task Group 20) supported the task force on the aircraft carrier USS Independence. Commanding Officer USS Guam (Task Force 124) was assigned the mission of seizing Pearls Airport and the port of Grenville, and of neutralizing any opposing forces in the area. Simultaneously, Army Rangers in Task Force 123 would secure points at the southern end of the island, including the airfield under construction near Point Salines. The 82d Airborne Division (Task Force 121) were designated to follow and assume the security at Point Salines once it was seized by Task Force 123. Task Group 20.5, a carrier battle group built around USS Independence, and Air Force elements would support the ground forces.

Ground forces

 1st and 2nd Ranger Battalions 75th Ranger Regiment conducted a low-level parachute assault to secure Point Salines Airport. Hunter Army Airfield, GA and Ft. Lewis, WA
 82nd Airborne Division – 2nd Brigade Task Force (325th Airborne Infantry Regiment 2nd & 3rd Battalions plus supporting units) and 3rd Brigade Task Force (1st and 2nd Battalions of the 505th Parachute Infantry Regiment, 1st and 2nd Battalions of the 508th Parachute Infantry Regiment, plus supporting units), A Company, 2nd Battalion 504th Parachute Infantry Regiment, 82nd MP General Support Platoon HHC, 313th MI BN (CEWI). Fort Bragg, NC, 1st Battalion of the 319th Field Artillery. 1st Battalion of the 320th Field Artillery.
 27th Engineer Battalion of the 20th Engineer Brigade (Airborne), Fort Bragg, NC
 548th Engineer Battalion Ft Bragg, NC
 160th Aviation Battalion Ft Campbell, KY
 18th Aviation Company, 269th Aviation Battalion Ft. Bragg, NC
 1st and 2nd 82nd Combat Aviation Battalion, Fort Bragg N.C.
 1 SQN 17 Air Cavalry Airborne, Fort Bragg N.C.
 65th MP Company (Airborne), 118th MP Company (Airborne), and HHD, 503rd MP Battalion (Airborne) of the 16th Military Police Brigade (Airborne), XVIII Airborne Corps, Fort Bragg, NC
 411th MP Company of the 89th Military Police Brigade, III Corps, Ft. Hood, Texas
 35th Signal Brigade, Ft. Bragg, NC
 50th Signal Battalion, 35th Signal Brigade, Ft. Bragg, NC
 203rd Military Intelligence Battalion, Aberdeen Proving Ground, MD
319th Military Intelligence Battalion and 519th Military Intelligence Battalion, 525th Military Intelligence Brigade, Fort Bragg, NC
 9th Psychological Operations Battalion (Airborne) of the 4th Psychological Operations Group (Airborne) – provided loudspeaker support and dissemination of informational pamphlets. Fort Bragg, NC
 1st Corps Support Command COSCOM, 7th Trans Battalion, 546th LMT Fort Bragg, NC
 44th Medical Brigade – Personnel from the 44th Medical Brigade and operational units including the 5th MASH were deployed. Fort Bragg, NC
 82nd Finance Company MPT
 22nd Marine Amphibious Unit Camp Lejeune, NC
 US Navy SEAL Team 4 Little Creek, VA and US Navy SEAL Team 6 Virginia Beach, VA
 Air Force Detachment 1, 507th Tactical Air Control Wing (Fort Bragg, NC) – jump qualified TACPs who were attached to and deployed with the 82d Airborne, Fort Bragg, NC (now the 14th ASOS, part of the 18th Air Support Operations Group)
 21st Tactical Air Support Squadron (Shaw AFB, SC). Jump qualified FACs who were attached to and deployed with Detachment 1, 507th Tactical Air Control Wing and the 82d Airborne, Fort Bragg, NC
 5th Weather Squadron, 5th Weather Wing (MAC) Fort Bragg, NC. Jump qualified combat weathermen who are attached and deployed with the 82nd, now in AFSOC
 Det 1 MACOS Combat Controllers
 1st Special Forces Operational Detachment–Delta

Air Force
 136th Tactical Airlift Wing, Texas Air National Guard – provided C-130 Hercules combat airlift support, cargo, and supplies
 Various Air National Guard tactical fighter wings and squadrons – provided A-7D Corsair II ground-attack aircraft for close air support
 23rd Tactical Fighter Wing – provided close air support for allied forces with A-10 Warthogs
 26th Air Defense Squadron NORAD – provided air support for allied forces with F-15 Eagles
 33rd Tactical Fighter Wing – provided air superiority cover for allied forces with F-15 Eagles
 437th Military Airlift Wing – provided airlift support with C-141 Starlifters
 1st Special Operations Wing – flew AC-130H Spectre gunships and MC-130E Combat Talons
 317th Military Airlift Wing – provided airlift support with C-130 Hercules from Pope AFB/Fort Bragg, NC complex to Grenada
 63d Military Airlift Wing – Provided airlift support with C-141 Starlifter aircraft in the air landing of Airborne troops, 63rd Security Police Squadron provided airfield security support – (Norton AFB CA)
 443rd Military Airlift Wing, 443rd Security Police Squadron (Altus AFB, OK) – provided a 44-man Airbase Ground Defense flight (Oct–Nov 1983)
 19th Air Refueling Wing – provided aerial refueling support for all other aircraft
 507th Tactical Air Control Wing (elements of the 21st TASS at Shaw AFB, SC and Detachment 1, Fort Bragg, NC) – provided Tactical Air Control Parties (TACPs) in support of the 82nd Airborne Division
 552nd Air Control Wing, providing air control support with E-3 Sentry AWACS aircraft
 62nd Security Police Group (Provisional) Multi Squadron Law Enforcement & Security Forces – Prisoner detaining and transport attached to 82nd Airborne
 60th Military Airlift Wing's 60th Security Police Squadron (Travis AFB, CA) provided airfield security in Grenada as well as Barbados. 602nd OMS provided aircraft recovery teams for cargo operations.

Navy
Carrier Group Four was allocated the designation Task Group 20.5 for the operation.

In addition, the following ships supported naval operations:

Coast Guard

 
 Law Enforcement Detachments
 HC-130 aircraft

See also 
 United States involvement in regime change
 Foreign interventions by the United States
 Heartbreak Ridge - a 1986 Clint Eastwood movie which includes the invasion.

Notes

Primary sources
 Grenada Documents, an Overview & Selection, DOD & State Dept, Sept 1984, 813 pages.
 Grenada, A Preliminary Report, DOD & State
 Joint Overview, Operation Urgent Fury, 1 May 1985, 87 pages

Further reading
 
 
  Official Pentagon study.
 
 Moore, Charles. Margaret Thatcher: At her Zenith in London, Washington and Moscow (2016) pp. 117–135.
 Payne, Anthony. "The Grenada crisis in British politics." The Round Table 73.292 (1984): 403–410. online
 , A military history.
 Williams, Gary. US–Grenada Relations: Revolution and Intervention in the Backyard (Macmillan, 2007).

External links
 Invasion of Grenada and Its Political Repercussions from the Dean Peter Krogh Foreign Affairs Digital Archives
 Operation: Urgent Fury, Grenada
 "Grenada, Operation Urgent Fury (23 October – 21 November 1983)"—Naval History & Heritage Command, U.S. Navy
 Grenadian Revolution Archive at marxists.org
 The dream of a Black utopia, podcast from The Washington Post. Includes interview with Dessima Williams, Grenada's former ambassador to the U.S.
 Grenada — a 1984 comic book about the invasion written by the CIA.

1983 in Grenada
1983 in the United States
Airborne operations
Cold War conflicts
Communism in Grenada
Conflicts in 1983
Cuba–United States relations
Grenada–United States military relations
Invasions by the United States
Invasions of Grenada
Military expeditions of the United States
Operations involving American special forces
Reagan administration controversies
United States Army Rangers
United States Marine Corps in the 20th century
United States–Caribbean relations
Grenada
Grenada
Grenada
Grenada
 
Grenada
Grenada
Grenada
Grenada
Invasions
Proxy wars
October 1983 events in North America
November 1983 events in North America
December 1983 events in North America
United States involvement in regime change